Beneful "Benny" Johnson is an American political columnist, currently serving as chief creative officer at conservative organization Turning Point USA. Johnson first rose to prominence as a staff writer at BuzzFeed, until he was fired following revelations that many of his published articles were plagiarized.

Johnson is currently the host of The Benny Report on Newsmax TV. Johnson is also employed by The Daily Caller.

Early life and education
Johnson grew up in Cedar Rapids, Iowa, and attended the University of Iowa. He majored in developmental psychology in 2009.

Career

In 2010, Johnson began contributing opinion pieces to the opinion website Breitbart. In 2011 he was hired as a full-time worker for Glenn Beck's TheBlaze, a conservative media website. In 2012, Johnson became a staff writer at BuzzFeed.

In July 2014, BuzzFeed found 41 instances of plagiarism in Johnson's writings, comprising almost ten percent of his work. He was subsequently fired from BuzzFeed and apologized for the plagiarism. A few weeks later, he became digital director at National Review.

In 2015, a few months after he was hired by National Review, he joined the Independent Journal Review (IJR) as a creative content contributor. Later that year, IJR staffers accused Johnson of plagiarizing an article about then-House Republican Conference chairwoman Cathy McMorris Rodgers. In late 2017, Johnson wrote an article containing the most controversial tweets of what he thought was the Boston antifa Twitter account. It was a fake account intended to lampoon antifa. Initially an editorial note was added, and the article was later removed.

In 2017, Johnson was suspended by IJR after Johnson's involvement in an article which asserted that Judge Derrick Watson's partial blocking of Executive Order 13780 was connected to former President Barack Obama's visit to Hawaii. Johnson had been warned that IJR could potentially be promoting a conspiracy theory, but assigned the story anyway. Later that year, Johnson was demoted for violating IJR's company ethics; Business Insider reported that Johnson had been verbally abusive and driven numerous staffers away from the IJR due to his management style. Johnson and IJR'''s relationship was terminated in October 2017.

Johnson joined The Daily Caller'' in November 2017.

References

External links
 

American political commentators
University of Iowa people
BuzzFeed people
Living people
1987 births
21st-century American journalists
People involved in plagiarism controversies
Blaze Media people
Newsmax TV people